Turbonilla garthi is a species of sea snail, a marine gastropod mollusk in the family Pyramidellidae, the pyrams and their allies. It has the genus Turbonilla.

References

External links
 To World Register of Marine Species

garthi
Gastropods described in 1939